The canton of Marie-Galante is an administrative division of Guadeloupe, an overseas department and region of France. It was created at the French canton reorganisation which came into effect in March 2015. Its seat is in Grand-Bourg.

It consists of the following communes:
Capesterre-de-Marie-Galante
Grand-Bourg
Saint-Louis

References

Cantons of Guadeloupe